Besnik "llapi" Podvorica (born 25 May 1986) in Dumosh, Kosovo, is a Kosovo Albanian professional basketball player who plays for Sigal Prishtina in Kosovo Basketball Superleague and in Balkan International Basketball League.

References

1986 births
Living people
Kosovo Albanians
Kosovan basketball players
People from Podujevo